Placido Escudero, known as Don Escudero, was a Filipino movie writer, actor, and director.

Life and career
Escudero was born on January 27, 1955, in Tiaong, Quezon. He graduated from De La Salle University, San Juan. He started in entertainment as an assistant, working with Lino Brocka, Ishmael Bernal and Mike de Leon.

Escudero was diagnosed with cancer and went through two years of treatments and had a remission before dying. He was survived by his mother Millie, brothers Manolet and Ugi and sister Mari. Escudero designed his own cremation urn kept at the chapel of the family-owned Villa Escudero in Tiaong, Quezon.

Filmography

Production Designer

Director

References

External links
 

1955 births
2011 deaths
De La Salle University alumni
Filipino film directors
Filipino writers
Male actors from Quezon
Artists from Quezon
Deaths from cancer in the Philippines
Deaths from liver cancer
Filipino male film actors